Leopold Skulski ; (15 November 1878, Zamość – Brest, 11 June 1940) served as prime minister of Poland for six months from 13 December 1919 until 9 June 1920 in the interim Legislative Sejm during the formation of sovereign Second Polish Republic following World War I.

Life
Skulski was involved in politics from at least the mid 1910s, and served as mayor of Łódź between 1917 and 1919. During the rebirth of sovereign Poland, he was active in the conservative Zjednoczenie Narodowe, representing the interests of landowners from Liga Narodowa.

He became a deputy in the Polish parliament (Sejm) after the 1919 elections from the parliamentary wing of Narodowe Zjednoczenie Ludowe (NZL) which split from Zwiazek Ludowo Narodowy (ZLN) under his leadership. 

On 13 December 1919, he became the Prime Minister of Poland. His government resigned on 9 June 1920, in the aftermath of the failure of the Kiev Offensive and the success of the Bolshevik counteroffensive,
in as much as the constitutional impasse resulting from the split of PSL "Wyzwolenie". 

Skulski was also the Minister of Internal Affairs under the government of Wincenty Witos (from 24 July 1920 to 28 June 1921). He was a member of the State Tribunal of Poland from 1925. President of the Polish Radio in the 1930s, he did not take an active role in political life in the last decade of his life.

Death
During the Invasion of Poland he was arrested in Pińsk by the Soviet NKVD; shortly thereafter he died in the NKVD prison in Brest.

References

1878 births
1940 deaths
People from Zamość
People from Lublin Governorate
Polish People's Party "Piast" politicians
Prime Ministers of Poland
Interior ministers of Poland
Members of the Legislative Sejm of the Second Polish Republic
Diplomats of the Second Polish Republic
Councillors in Łódź
Polish chemists
Polish people detained by the NKVD
Polish civilians killed in World War II
Polish people who died in Soviet detention